Ana Gabriela Guevara Espinoza (born March 4, 1977) is a Mexican former track and field athlete who specialized in the 400 meters and is the 7th fastest female 300-meter runner in the world, running 300 meters in 35.3 seconds on May 3, 2003. She served as a Mexican Senator for the 2012–2018 term.

Early life
Guevara was born in Nogales, Sonora. Her parents are Cesar Octavio Guevara and Ana María Espinoza. She has four siblings: Azalia, César, Daniela, and Jaime.

Athletic career
Ana's career began in 1996 when she started participating in her first international competition. In 1998, she won two silver medals in the Central American and Caribbean Games in the 400 and 800 meters.

Her first major victory was the gold medal in the 400 meters at the 1999 Pan American Games in Canada. A year later, she qualified to the 2000 Sydney Olympics going to the 400 meters finals, finishing with a reasonable 5th place with a time of 49.96 seconds. After that race, she won 28 consecutive international races before a second-place finish in Rome in July 2004.

In 2001, she won the 400-meter race at the Herculis in Monaco, one of the two 400-meter events held at Golden League competitions that year. At the 2001 World Championships in Athletics, Guevara made the finals in the 400 m. She came off the last turn leading the race with about 105 meters to go. Unfortunately, she could not keep the fast pace and was passed by Amy Mbacké Thiam from Senegal and Lorraine Fenton from Jamaica with no more than 20 meters to go. Guevara won the bronze medal posting a season-best with a time of 49.97 seconds. In fact, Fenton and Mbacke Thiam also posted personal bests, the last one also being a national record.

In 2002, she won all seven competitions of 400 m of the Golden League (Oslo, Paris, Rome, Monaco, Zürich, Brussels and Berlin) sharing the jackpot of one million dollars in gold bars with three athletes. She also won the gold medal at the 2002 IAAF World Cup in 400 m and 400 m relay, running for the Americas team. She won the 2002 IAAF Grand Prix Final in Paris.

In 2003, she defended her title in the 400 m at the 2003 Pan American Games winning the gold medal. She won the 400-meter race at the Weltklasse Zürich, one of the two 400 m events held at Golden League competitions that year. Later, on August 27, 2003, in Paris, France, she won the 2003 World Championships in Athletics in the women's 400 meters. She set a personal record, a national record, and a world-leading time, finishing in 48.89 seconds. She won the 400 m at the 2003 IAAF World Athletics Final in Monaco.

Guevara made her second Olympic appearance in 2004 as the flag carrier for the Mexican delegation and represented her country in the 400 m. After winning her heat in the first round, and her corresponding semi-final, she would go on to win the silver medal in the final. She won the 400 m at the 2004 IAAF World Athletics Final in Monaco.

A year later, at the 2005 World Championships in Athletics, she won the bronze medal in the 400 meters with a time of 49.81 seconds, despite the heavy rainfall that occurred during the event.

In 2007, for the third consecutive time, she won the gold medal in the 400 m at the 2007 Pan American Games. In addition, she led Mexico's 4 × 400 m relay team to a second-place finish. About a month later, at the age of 30, Guevara participated in her fourth World Championships in Athletics in Osaka, Japan. She finished in fourth place with a season-best time of 50.16 seconds, just 0.01 seconds ahead of 24-year-old DeeDee Trotter of the United States.

On January 16, 2008, she announced her retirement from all competitions due to conflicts with Mariano Lara, the then president of the Mexican Athletics Federation. No help was received at that time from Carlos Hermosillo, director of the CONADE (Comision Nacional de Cultura Fisica y Deporte), who did not act rapidly and the problem only grew bigger and continued for months. Ana finally said, "My retirement from sport in Mexico is now definitive, I contemplated the possibility of participating independently at the Olympic Games, but my dream was to participate for my country."

Political career 
In 2009, Guevara entered politics, standing as the Democratic Revolution Party (PRD) candidate for Miguel Hidalgo Delegation in Mexico City, ultimately losing to Demetrio Sodi from the National Action Party (PAN). She is a Mexican Senator for the 2012–2018 term having been postulated by the PRD, the Labor Party (PT), and the Citizen Movement Party.

On December 13, 2016, near Mexico City, Guevara was struck by a car while riding her motorcycle and was then physically beaten by the four men who were in the car. News outlets created a national outrage over this incident.

Personal bests

Achievements

References

External links
Official Website
 
 Ana Guevara's race history at The-Sports.org

1977 births
Living people
Mexican female sprinters
Athletes (track and field) at the 1999 Pan American Games
Athletes (track and field) at the 2003 Pan American Games
Athletes (track and field) at the 2007 Pan American Games
Athletes (track and field) at the 2000 Summer Olympics
Athletes (track and field) at the 2004 Summer Olympics
Olympic athletes of Mexico
Olympic silver medalists for Mexico
People from Nogales, Sonora
Sportspeople from Sonora
World Athletics Championships medalists
Medalists at the 2004 Summer Olympics
Women members of the Senate of the Republic (Mexico)
Labor Party (Mexico) politicians
Members of the Senate of the Republic (Mexico)
Pan American Games gold medalists for Mexico
Pan American Games silver medalists for Mexico
Olympic silver medalists in athletics (track and field)
21st-century Mexican politicians
21st-century Mexican women politicians
Pan American Games medalists in athletics (track and field)
Central American and Caribbean Games gold medalists for Mexico
Central American and Caribbean Games silver medalists for Mexico
Goodwill Games medalists in athletics
IAAF Golden League winners
World Athletics Championships winners
Central American and Caribbean Games medalists in athletics
Competitors at the 2001 Goodwill Games
Medalists at the 1999 Pan American Games
Medalists at the 2003 Pan American Games
Medalists at the 2007 Pan American Games
Goodwill Games gold medalists in athletics
Olympic female sprinters
Politicians from Sonora
Mexican sportsperson-politicians